Partners in Crime is an American crime drama television series set in San Francisco, California, created by William Driskill, that aired on NBC from September 27 to December 29, 1984 during the 1984–85 U.S. television season. NBC cancelled the show after 13 episodes. It was screened overseas as Fifty/Fifty, to avoid confusion with the British series Agatha Christie's Partners in Crime which was also shown on ITV in the United Kingdom.

Overview
The series starred Lynda Carter as Carole Stanwyck and Loni Anderson as Sydney Kovack, two women with little in common except sharing Raymond as an ex-husband. When Raymond winds up murdered, Carole and Sydney set out to find his killer and eventually decide to run the detective agency Raymond has left them. They were assisted in their efforts by Raymond's assistant (Walter Olkewicz), Raymond's mother (Eileen Heckart), and Lt. Vronsky (Leo Rossi).

Cast
Lynda Carter as Carole Stanwyck
Loni Anderson as Sydney Kovack
Walter Olkewicz as Harmon Shain
Leo Rossi as Lt. Ed Vronsky
Eileen Heckart as Jeanine

Episodes

References

External links

1984 American television series debuts
1984 American television series endings
NBC original programming
1980s American crime drama television series
English-language television shows
Television series by Carson Productions
Television shows set in San Francisco